Ottara District is a district of the Naypyidaw Union Territory in Myanmar.

References 

Districts of Myanmar
Naypyidaw